Little Iodine is a 1946 American comedy film directed by Reginald Le Borg and written by Richard H. Landau. The film is based on the comic strip Little Iodine by Jimmy Hatlo. The film stars Jo Ann Marlowe, Marc Cramer, Eve Whitney, Irene Ryan, and Hobart Cavanaugh. The film was released on October 20, 1946, by United Artists. All prints of the film were destroyed after 10 years, effectively making it a lost film.

Plot
Little Iodine (Marlowe) stays true to her comic strip nature in this film, where she does her best to break up the marriage of her parents (Cavanaugh and Ryan), ruin a romance between Janis and Marc (Whitney and Cramer), and cost her father his job. Unlike her comic-based character, however, Iodine has a change of heart and sets out to right the wrongs.

Cast 
Jo Ann Marlowe as Little Iodine
Marc Cramer as Marc Andrews
Eve Whitney as Janis Payne
Irene Ryan as Mrs. Tremble
Hobart Cavanaugh as Mr. Tremble
Lanny Rees as Horace
Leon Belasco as Simkins
Emory Parnell as Mr. Bigdome
Sarah Selby as Mrs. Bigdome
Jean Tartriquin as Grandma Jones

References

External links 
 
Review of film at Variety

1946 films
American black-and-white films
Films directed by Reginald Le Borg
United Artists films
1946 comedy films
American comedy films
Films based on American comics
Lost American films
1940s English-language films
1940s American films